9:05 is an interactive fiction game developed by Adam Cadre in 2000. The story follows a man who wakes up and gets a call telling him to go to work, and it follows branching paths. The game is commonly used as a gateway to text adventure games because of its short length and overall simplicity and is used by English as a second language (ESL) teachers to help students attain mastery of English.

Gameplay
The game uses a text input system to allow the user to control the actions of the character (e.g. using "Open door" as a command to instruct the character to open a door). The entire game is text-based and takes around five minutes to finish.

Plot
The character wakes up to a phone ringing next to him. After picking up the phone, someone screams at him that he has to be at work or he will be fired. The character changes out of his soiled clothes and after cleaning up, gets into a car. Upon arriving at the office, he sits down in a cubicle and fills out a form. When he goes to turn in the form, the boss who had been on the phone earlier asks, "Who the hell are you?" The game ends with a news anchor reporting that a murderer killed his victim and hid him under the bed. He put on his clothes and tried to assume his victim's career. The anchor says that the character will be seeking an insanity plea.

On subsequent playthroughs, the player can look underneath the bed to find a dead body, that the character had murdered, and can choose to flee in the car instead of going to the office.

Development
The game was created by Adam Cadre in response to a Usenet thread about straightforward vs. oblique writing in interactive fiction. Cadre has written that the use of 9:05 as an introduction to interactive fiction "is pretty nifty, but is certainly not what I intended; I was just
participating in an obscure doctrinal dispute".

Reception
9:05 is commonly cited as an effective entry point to interactive fiction, and many critics have ranked it among the best interactive fiction games ever created. Jay Is Games Jay Bibby called the game "enjoyable and surprising" and thought that it would be perfect for a casual audience. Rock, Paper, Shotgun Adam Smith felt that it was a great entrypoint to interactive fiction. PC Gamer Richard Cobbett praised the game for showing how "toying with a single preconception can make for something incredibly clever". In Anastasia Salter's book on Adventure games, she calls 9:05 subversive and praised how it played on the player's expectations. In the book Writing for Video Games, 9:05 was listed as the second-most notable interactive fiction game.

English as a second language (ESL) teachers and classes use 9:05 as a way to teach the English language. Multiple lesson plans use 9:05 as a way for ESL students to contextualize verbs in a simple and engaging story. An ESL teacher in Portugal felt that 9:05 easy vocabulary and story made it simpler for students to engage with the material and use it after leaving school.

References

External links
 9:05, the full game hosted on Adam Cadre's website
 
 

2000 video games
2000s interactive fiction
Video games developed in Australia